Warner Music Australia Pty Limited (WMA) is the Australian division of the Warner Music Group. Warner Music Australia also distributes in New Zealand.

History
In 1969, Warner Bros. Records branched out and WEA was born. The first country in which it was established was Canada, with the second being Australia. The Australian operation was begun in July 1970, by Paul Turner with five staff members. The official opening was held at Menzies Hotel, Sydney, on 1 October 1970. The company was then based in Riley Street, Darlinghurst, and had three major labels, Warner Bros. Records, Elektra Records, and Atlantic Records.

A year later Warner Bros. Records worldwide (including Australia) changed its name to Kinney Music. The monopoly laws in America at the time did not allow the three labels to trade as one, and so the umbrella name of Kinney Music came into being. For the first two years, the Australian Record Company (ARC), now known as Sony Music, handled the Australian distribution.

Turner's budgeted income for the first year was one million dollars. That was achieved in seven months, with the first year's sales being just under two million dollars. By 1 October 1972, US monopoly laws had also changed and WEA (the first initial of each of the three main labels) was born. From that time, WEA Australia had its own sales and distribution arm. Adding a warehouse to the offices forced a change of location to George Place, in the Sydney suburb of Artarmon.

WEA became a major player in the Australian recording industry, through international successes of artists such as Fleetwood Mac, Phil Collins, Eric Clapton, Led Zeppelin , and The Doors.

The company was renamed Warner Music Australia in 1990 and split into two divisions – WEA and East-West Records. More focus was being placed on domestic signings, and phenomenal success was achieved with acts such as INXS, Cold Chisel, 1927, and Jenny Morris.

In the mid-to-late 1990s, Warner Music also invested in Brisbane bands Regurgitator and Pretty Violet Stain, when Brisbane music was becoming more popular.  Regurgitator became Warner Music's first direct signing and remained with the company until 2004. In 2005, Sire Records invested in Brisbane band The Veronicas, who went straight to number 2 with their debut single "4 Ever" and the album "The Secret Life of the Veronicas".  Later that year, Warner Music Australia bought out Festival-Mushroom Records for $12 million and closed the label, while retaining the use of the Mushroom label for a couple of acts such as Eskimo Joe and Gabriella Cilmi.

, the company has continued with artists such as Kerser, Lisa Mitchell, the New Zealand band Evermore, Kylie Minogue, and the newly signed Brisbane act, Dead Letter Circus. Warner Music also invested heavily in producers such as ShockOne and Matt Lange.

Artists

 A Boogie Wit Da Hoodie
 A Day To Remember
 Arizona (band)
 AB6IX
 Alec Benjamin
 Ali Gatie
 All Time Low
 Angel Du$t
 Anitta
 Anne Marie
 Aretha Franklin
 Asher
 Ashley McBryde
 Ashnikko
 Ava Max
 BabyT
 Bazzi
 BBG Smokey
 Bebe Rexha
 Ben Abraham (musician)
 Bhad Bhabie
 Biffy Clyro
 Billie Joe Armstrong
 Billy Talent
 Birdy
 Blake Shelton
 Breland
 Briston Maroney
 Bronson (Odesza and Golden Features)
 Bruno Mars
 Bryce Vine
 Budjerah 
 Burna Boy
 Busby Marou
 Cardi B
 Carlie Hanson
 Cavetown
 Cecily
 Charli XCX
 Charlie Puth
 Chase Zera
 Cher
 Clean Bandit
 Client Liaison
 Code Orange
 Coheed & Cambria
 Coldplay
 Corey Taylor
 Creeper
 daine
 Dan + Shay
 David Bowie
 David Guetta
 Deftones
 Diplo
 Disturbed
 Don Toliver
 Dua Lipa
 Dutchavelli
 Eagles
 EAST AV3
 Eco$ystem
 Ed Sheeran
 Ekali
 Elderbrook
 Eskimo Joe
 E^ST
 Faith No More
 Faouzia
 Feki
 Fever 333
 Fitz and The Tantrums
 Fleetwood Mac
 Flowerkid
 Foals
 Galantis
 Galxara
 Glades
 Gojira
 Golden Features
 Goo Goo Dolls
 Gorillaz
 Grandma
 Greenday
 Griff
 Grouplove
 Gucci Mane
 Halestorm
 Hamilton
 Hamzaa
 Harper Finn
 Hartley
 Hayley Kiyoko
 Hayley Williams
 Higher Power
 Highly Suspect
 Hobo Johnson
 Hooligan Hefs
 Honne
 In This Moment
 Iron Maiden
 J Rick
 Jack Gray
 Jack Harlow
 James Blunt
 Janelle Monae
 Jason Derulo
 JC Stewart
 Jess Glynne
 John Williamson
 JoJo
 Josh Groban
 Joyous Wolf
 Jubel
 jxdn
 JXN
 k.d lang
 Kaleo
 Kehlani
 Kelly Clarkson
 Killboy
 Kinder
 Kita Alexander
 KORN
 Kranium
 Kyle
 Kylie Minogue
 L Devine
 Lara Andallo 
 Led Zeppelin
 Liam Gallagher
 Lianne La Havas
 Lil Jaye 
 Lil Pump
 Lil Skies
 Lil Zay Osama
 Linkin Park
 Lizzo
 Lukas Graham
 Mac Miller
 Mahalia
 Maisie Peters
 Major Lazer
 Marina Diamandis
 Master KG
 Mastedon
 Matoma
 Matt Maeson
 Meek Mill
 Melanie Martinez
 Michael Buble
 Missy Elliot
 MIST
 MisterWives
 Monique Lawz
 Morgan Evans
 Motionless in White
 Muse
 My Chemical Romance
 Nasty Cherry
 Nathan Dawe
 Needtobreathe
 Neil Young
 Nickelback
 NLE Choppa
 No Comply
 Nomad
 Nothing, Nowhere.
 Oliver Tree
 ONE OK ROCK
 Pa Salieu
 Panic At The Disco
 Paramore
 PARTYNEXTDOOR
 Perto
 Phil Collins
 Pink Sweat$
 Prince
 Pvris
 Ramones
 Red Hot Chili Peppers
 Rico Nasty
 Rita Ora
 RINI
 RMR
 Rob Thomas
 Robin Schulz
 Rod Stewart
 Roddy Ricch
 Rory Noble Copy
 Royal Blood
 Rudimental
 S1mba
 Sabrina Claudio
 Safia
 Saint Motel
 Sam Feldt
 Saweetie
 Scott Helman
 Shihad
 Shinedown
 ShockOne
 Shoreline Mafia
 Sia
 Skrillex
 Slipknot
 Sloan Peterson 
 Smith & Myers
 Stone Sour
 Stormzy
 Sub Urban
 Sueco the Child
 Tayla Parx
 The Adults
 The Amity Affliction
 The band CAMINO
 The Black Keys
 The Doors
 The Flaming Lips
 The Front Bottoms
 The Highwomen
 The Kite String Tangle
 The Knocks
 The Magic Gang 
 The Snuts
 The Wombats
 Thelma Plum
 Theory of A Deadman
 Thomston
 Tiesto
 Tina Turner
 Tinie Tempah
 Trey Songz
 Trivium
 Turnstile
 Tviling
 Twenty One Pilots
 Ty Dolla $ign
 UNO Stereo
 Wafia
 Wale
 Wallows
 Weezer
 Whethan 
 Whipped Cream
 Why Don't We 
 Wiz Khalifa
 YBN Cordae
 YFN Lucci
 YoungBoy Never Broke Again

Former artists

 1927
 Archie Roach
 Bang The Drum
 Bardot
 Ben Abraham
 Boom Crash Opera
 Brothers 3
 Christina Parie
 Cold Chisel
 Cookin On 3 Burners
 Dane Rumble
 Dead Letter Circus
 Dylan Joel
 Evermore
 Euphoria
 Goanna
 Gyan
 Gyroscope
 Hopium
 INXS
 Jenny Morris
 Karmadella
 Kasey Chambers
 Katie Noonan
 Kerser
 Kiley Gaffney
 Kim Churchill
 Lisa Mitchell
 Magic Dirt
 Make Them Suffer
 Mass Collective Mind 
 Moonlight
 Pretty Violet Stain
 Regurgitator
 Ross Wilson
 Shannon Noll
 Stone Temple Pilots
 Super Cruel
 Thirsty Merc
 The Sundance Kids
 The Whitlams
 The Ferrets
 The Sharp
 The Superjesus
 Throttle
 Titanium
 Turquoise Prince
 VASSY
 Xavier Dunn
 Zoë Badwi

Warner Vision Australia
Warner Vision Australia, a company of Warner Music Australasia, released a series of VHS and DVD on the History of the Olympic Games:

The Official Films Of The Olympic Games: London 1948 (Volume 1)
The Official Films Of The Olympic Games: Melbourne 1956 (Volume 2)
The Official Films Of The Olympic Games: Rome 1960 (Volume 3)
The Official Films of the Olympic Games: Tokyo 1964 (Volume 4)
The Official Films Of The Olympic Games: Mexico City 1968 (Volume 5)
The Official Films Of The Olympic Games: Montreal 1976 (Volume 6)
The Official Films Of The Olympic Games: Moscow 1980 (Volume 7)
The Official Films Of The Olympic Games: Los Angeles 1984 (Volume 8)
The Official Films Of The Olympic Games: Seoul 1988 (Volume 9)
The Official Films Of The Olympic Games: Barcelona 1992 (Volume 10)
The Official Films Of The Olympic Games: Atlanta 1996 (Volume 11)

Warner Music Vision Australia released a series of DVDs as a joint-venue with the Nine Network:
Ray Martin Presents: Graham Kennedy – The King Of Television
The Best Of The Paul Hogan Show
Channel Nine Salutes Bert Newton
The Best Of The Don Lane Show
Paul Hogan's England
Studio 9 Unplugged
Laughs & Larrikins: Midday With Ray Martin
Golden Logies Moments
Hey Hey It's Saturday ... By Request
Hey Hey It's Saturday ... By Request 2

See also

List of record labels

References

External links

Australian record labels
Australian subsidiaries of foreign companies
Warner Music labels
Former Time Warner subsidiaries
New Zealand record labels
Music companies